Paulo Flores (born 1972) is a musician from Angola.

Flores was born in Luanda and spent some of his childhood in Lisbon. His music is mostly written in Portuguese though some is in the Kimbundu language.  His music is often political dealing with the hardships of Angolan life, the war, and corruption. His Angolan style of music is known as Semba. Some of his music was featured in the French film La Grande Ourse. In April 2007 he performed at the first Trienale de Luanda and on 4 July 2008 Paulo Flores performed at a concert at Coqueiros stadium with about 25.000 people. In late July/early August 2009 he performed at the opening Luanda International Jazz Festival.

Paulo Flores is the peace ambassador of Luanda, so his tickets cannot exceed a limit of $5 per person in Luanda.

Beginning on 28 February 2011 the airline TAP Portugal began airing its "TAP With Arms Wide Open" (TAP de Braços Abertos) campaign, featuring its new slogan. Three singers, Flores, the Brazilian singer Roberta de Sá, and the Portuguese singer Mariza starred in a music video with the song "Arms Wide Open."

Personal
Flores has three sons: Joshua Teixeira Flores (The Best), Fabio, Kiari Luã and, one favourite son, Sean and, one daughter; Kesiah Maria.

Discography 
 Kapuete Kamundanda, 1988
 Sassasa, 1990
 Thunda Mu N'jilla, 1992
 Brincadeira Tem Hora, 1993
 Inocenti, 1995
 Canta Meu Semba, 1996
 Perto do Fim, 1998
 Recompasso, 1999
 Xé Povo, 2003
 The Best, 2003
 Quintal do Semba, 2003
 Vivo, 2005
 Ex-Combatentes, 2009
 Ex-Combatentes Redux, 2012
 O País Que Nasceu Meu Pai, 2013

References

1972 births
Living people
Angolan expatriates in Portugal
Angolan folk singers
Singers from Lisbon
People from Luanda
Angolan songwriters
21st-century Angolan male singers
20th-century Angolan male singers